Ike Kinswa State Park is a public recreation area on the northern side of Lake Mayfield, located  northwest of Mossyrock in Lewis County, Washington. The state park covers  that include  of shoreline mostly along the Tilton River including the point where the Tilton and Cowlitz rivers once merged. The park offers boating, fishing, swimming, waterskiing and windsurfing plus facilities for camping, hiking, and mountain biking, It is managed by the Washington State Parks and Recreation Commission.

History
The park came into existence with the construction of the Mayfield Dam in 1963. In 1971, the park's original name, Mayfield Lake State Park, was changed to Ike Kinswa State Park, in honor of a member of the Cowlitz Indian Tribe.

References

External links
Ike Kinswa State Park Washington State Parks and Recreation Commission 
Ike Kinswa State Park Map Washington State Parks and Recreation Commission

State parks of Washington (state)
Parks in Lewis County, Washington
Protected areas established in 1963